The 1985 Fischer-Grand Prix was a men's tennis tournament played on indoor hard courts at the Wiener Stadthalle in Vienna in Austria that was part of the 1985 Nabisco Grand Prix. It was the tenth edition of the tournament and took place from 18 November until 25 November 1985. Jan Gunnarsson won the singles title.

Finals

Singles

 Jan Gunnarsson defeated  Libor Pimek 6–7, 6–2, 6–4, 1–6, 7–5
 It was Gunnarsson's only title of the year and the 6th of his career.

Doubles

 Mike De Palmer /  Gary Donnelly defeated  Sergio Casal /  Emilio Sánchez 6–4, 6–3
 It was de Palmer's 2nd title of the year and the 2nd of his career. It was Donnelly's only title of the year and the 2nd of his career.

References

External links
 ATP tournament profile
 ITF tournament edition details

 
Fischer-Grand Prix
Vienna Open
Vienna